Lamellilatirus ceramidus is a species of sea snail, a marine gastropod mollusc in the family Fasciolariidae, the spindle snails, the tulip snails and their allies.

Description

Distribution
Type locality: Barbados, West Indies.

Dredged at depths around 150–200 metres.

References

ceramidus
Gastropods described in 1889